A cartoon is any of several forms of visual art.

Cartoon or cartoons may also refer to:

Arts, entertainment, and media

Music

Groups
Cartoon, an Australian funk rock band
Cartoon, an Estonian electro music band
Cartoons (band), a Danish novelty band

Songs
"Cartoon", a song by Soul Asylum from their 1988 album Hang Time
"Cartoon", a song by Young Dro from his 2006 album Best Thang Smokin'
"Cartoon", Paul Bley Trio
"Cartoons" (Chris Rice song), 1989
"Cartoons" (Cupcakke song), 2017
"Cartoons", song by Franklyn Ajaye, 1976

Periodicals
CARtoons Magazine, an American publication that focuses on automotive humor and hot rod artwork
Cartoons Magazine, a defunct American publication that focused on newspaper editorial and political cartoons

Television
Cartoon (TV series), German TV series (1967–1972)
Cartoon Network, a US-based cable network, sometimes abbreviated to Cartoon
"The Cartoon", an episode of Seinfeld

Other uses in arts, entertainment, and media
Animated cartoon, a drawn film for TV, movies, or internet
 Modello, a preparatory study or model drawn in cardboard, typically as the base image for a tapestry

Other uses
Cartoon (typeface), 1936 typeface issued by Bauer Type Foundry

See also
Anime
Car Tunes, a series of children's song recordings by Sharon, Lois & Bram
"Cartunes", animated shorts by Walter Lantz Productions
Comic (disambiguation)
Manga
Toon (disambiguation)